Roy K. Moore (June 11, 1914 – October 12, 2008) was an American FBI agent and former Marine who was best known as the chief agent who investigated the disappearance of civil rights workers James Chaney, Michael Schwerner and Andrew Goodman. The 1988 film Mississippi Burning, starring Gene Hackman and Willem Dafoe, was based on that case. Because of the efforts of Moore and his agents, nineteen men were indicted and seven were convicted. All served fewer than six years in prison.

Biography 
Roy Moore was born on June 11, 1914, in Hood River, Oregon, United States.

See also

Citations

References

 

Federal Bureau of Investigation agents
United States Marines
People from Hood River, Oregon
1914 births
2008 deaths